Josephat Machuka (born 12 December 1973) is a Kenyan long-distance runner. He won IAAF World Cross Country Championships junior bronze medal in 1992 and 1993. In the  1996 IAAF World Cross Country Championships he was 10th and was part of the Kenyan team that won team gold.

At the 1992 World Junior Championships he competed in the 10,000 metres finishing second, but as he was being passed just before the finish, he deliberately punched at the eventual winner Haile Gebrselassie during the final sprint and was disqualified.  Overshadowed by Gebrselassie his entire career, this early incident is what Machuka is best remembered for.

He competed at the 1996 Atlanta Olympics, finishing fifth in the men's 10,000 metres race, won by Haile Gebrselassie.

He was also fifth in the 1995 World Championships 10,000 metres race. He won the Eurocross meeting in Luxembourg in 1998.

Machuka was also a successful road runner. He won the Bloomsday Run in 1994 and 1995. Machuka won the Steamboat Classic 4-mile race in 1995. In the Netherlands he won the Zevenheuvelenloop (a 15 kilometres race) twice, in 1995 and 1996, just as the Dam tot Damloop, in 1993 and 1996.

International competitions

References

External links

1973 births
Living people
Kenyan male long-distance runners
Kenyan male cross country runners
Olympic athletes of Kenya
Athletes (track and field) at the 1996 Summer Olympics
African Games gold medalists for Kenya
African Games medalists in athletics (track and field)
Athletes (track and field) at the 1995 All-Africa Games
World Athletics Championships athletes for Kenya